Konkani alphabets refers to the five different scripts (Devanagari, Roman, Kannada, Malayalam and Perso-Arabic scripts) currently used to write the Konkani language.

As of 1987, the "Goan Antruz dialect" in the Devanagari script has been declared Standard Konkani and  promulgated as an official language in the Indian state of Goa. As Konkani in the Roman script is not mandated as an official script by law. However, an ordinance passed by the government of Goa allows the use of Roman script for official communication. This ordinance has been put into effect by various ministries in varying degrees. For example, the 1996 Goa Panchayat Rules stipulate that the various forms used in the election process must be in both the Roman and Devanagari script.

Ancient
The earliest inscription in Konkani in Goykanadi script (extinct now) is of the Gupta period in the 2nd century CE found at Aravalem, Goa. It reads

(On the top of Shachipura)

The famous inscription at the foot of the colossal Jain monolith Gomaṭēśvara (Bāhubali) Konkani: gomṭo - pretty masc., īśvar - God at Shravanabelagola of 981 CE reads,

(Chavundaraya got it done, Gangaraya got it done again.)

At the foot of the Gommateshwara at Shravanabelagola there are two inscriptions. One on the right foot and one on the left. On the right foot the inscription is written in old Kannada. On the left foot it is in Devanagari.

Present

The rules for writing Konkani in the Devanagari script are elucidated in  a book released by the Goa Konkani Academy titled kōṅkaṇī śuddhalēkhanācē nēm. While the rules for writing Konkani in the Roman script are elucidated in a book titled thomas sṭīvans koṅkaṇi kēndr Romi Lipi by writer Pratap Naik, released by Konkani singer Ullās Buyā̃v at Dalgado Konkani Academy and in Romi Lipient Konknni Kors.

Vowels and syllabic consonants

Observations

 ॠ, ऌ and  ॡ are rarely used in Konkani except to render tatsam words. e.g. कॣप्त (imagined-derivative of कल्पना)
 अ, ओ and ऒ are rendered in the Roman script by o. Under Portuguese rule, the Konkani language was modified to fit the Roman syllabary system. As a result, Portuguese orthography has eliminated or deformed original Konkani sounds. e.g.
 अ - करता kartā is written as korta or even corta (sometimes it is nasalised to cortam)
 ओ - दोन dōn is written as don.
 ऒ - पॊरनॆं pornẽ is written as pornem
 आ and ऍ are rendered by a and ê respectively in the Roman script.
 आ - हांव hā̃v is written as hanv or Anv
 ऍ - कॅनरा kænarā is written as Kanara or Canara.
 Nasal vowels in certain cases are represented by a tilde (~) above the character e.g. pãy (foot).
 For explicit differentiation, closed vowels (ए and ओ) are represented with a circumflex (ê and ô), while open vowels (ऍ and ऑ) are represented by (e and o). However, the circumflex is sometimes omitted if it is expected that the reader will know the correct vowel sound.

Consonants

Observations
 ಚ and ച in the Kannada and Malayalam scripts respectively, render two sounds, (c) and (t͡ʃ).
 ಜ and ജ in the Kannada and Malayalam scripts respectively, render two sounds, (ɟ) and (d͡ʒ).
 In the Roman script, a retroflex consonant is got by simply doubling the corresponding dental consonant; e.g. त - ta, ट - Tta.
 Roman Konkani does not distinguish between श and ष. Both are written as Sha or Xa and pronounced as श.
 Roman Konkani does not distinguish between फ and फ़. Both are normally written as F and pronounced accordingly. e.g. tomorrow  फाल्लॆक (phāllek)- fallek (fāllek)
 ن nūn in the Nawayati Konkani script not only is a separate consonant, but also performs the role of the anusvāra. It indicates a homorganic nasal preceding another consonant; e.g. رنگ raṅg, انڈو aṇḍo. It also undergoes nasalisation; e.g. ہازؤ hāṃv.
 ع, ayin غ ghayin and ح  he in the Nawayati Konkani script are used for incorporated  Perso-Arabic words.
 Joined characters are denoted with an apostrophe ('), e.g., mell'lo. m followed by an apostrophe at the end of a word indicates that the m consonant is to be pronounced, and that it is not a nasal vowel, e.g. kam'.

Nasal consonants and nasalisation

In  Konkani, the  ं  is traditionally defined as representing a nasal stop homorganic to a following plosive,() and also vowel nasalisation. The precise phonetic value of the phoneme is dependent on the phonological environment. Word-finally, it is realized as nasalization of the preceding vowel (e.g.  , "a well"). It results in vowel nasalization also medially between a short vowel and a non-obstruent (  "you (acc.)". It is pronounced as a homorganic nasal, with the preceding vowel becoming nasalized allophonically, in the following cases: between a long vowel and a voiced stop (  "copper",   "silver"), between a long vowel and a voiceless stop (  "tooth"),  and also between a short vowel and an obstruent (  "to support", The last rule has two sets of exceptions where the  effects only a nasalization of the preceding short vowel. Words from the first set are morphologically derived from words with a long nasalized vowel ("meat". In such cases the vowel is sometimes denasalized (. The  second set is composed of a few words like ("to arrive".)

Avagraha (ऽ)

Konkani is one of the few modern Indo-Aryan languages to apply the avagraha beyond mere sustenance of an exclamation, cry or shout in speech. It is used by verbs in continuous tense. The avagraha is not used in Standard Konkani in the continuous tense. Its use is however popular and prevalent amongst the Canara Saraswats, both Gaud and Bhanap, writing in their native Amchigele dialect, in the continuous tense with the aim of conforming to the schwa deletion rule.

(According to the schwa deletion rule in Indo-Aryan languages, करत आसा will be read as karat āsā and not as karta'sā as prevalent pronunciation is.)

The avagraha is also used to mark the non-elision of word-final inherent a, which otherwise is a modern orthographic convention: बैसऽ baisa "sit" versus बैस bais.

Schwa deletion

The schwa deletion or schwa syncope phenomenon plays a crucial role in Konkani and several other Indo-Aryan languages, where schwas implicit in the written scripts of those languages are obligatorily deleted for correct pronunciation. Schwa syncope is extremely important in these languages for intelligibility and unaccented speech. It also presents a challenge to non-native speakers and speech synthesis software because the scripts, including Nagar Barap, do not provide indicators of where schwas should be dropped.

This means the schwa ('ə') implicit in each consonant of the script is "obligatorily deleted" at the end of words and in certain other contexts, unlike in Sanskrit. This phenomenon has been termed the "schwa syncope rule" or the "schwa deletion rule" of Konkani. In other words, when a vowel-preceded consonant is followed by a vowel-succeeded consonant, the schwa inherent in the first consonant is deleted. However, this formalization is inexact and incomplete (i.e. sometimes deletes a schwa when it shouldn't or, at other times, fails to delete it when it should), and can yield errors. Schwa deletion is computationally important because it is essential to building text-to-speech software for Konkani. Without the appropriate deletion of schwas, any speech output would sound unnatural.

Vowel nasalization
With some words that contain /n/ or /m/ consonants separated from succeeding consonants by schwas, the schwa deletion process has the effect of nasalizing any preceding vowels. Some examples in Konkani  include:
 jẽvaṇ => jẽvlo

Schwa rules
 The final inherent अ is generally omitted. E.g. देव is dēv, not dēva.
 Schwa is retained in single letter words. E.g. क is ka, not k.
 Schwa is omitted if the next letter is a consonant conjunct. E.g. आमच्या is Āmcyā, not Āmacyā.
 Schwa is retained in the second letter of a three letter word that ends अ. E.g. करप is karap, not karp.
 Schwa is omitted from the second letter of a three letter word that ends with a vowel other than अ. E.g. चॆरकॊ is cerko, not cerako.
 Schwa is omitted from the second letter of a word with four letters. E.g. करपाची is karpāci, not karapāci.
 Schwa is retained in the third letter of a word with four letters, if the final letter ends with a vowel other than अ. E.g. आंगवणी is Āṅgvaṇī, not Āṅgvṇī.
 Verb roots always end in a consonant even if they undergo declination. e.g. आपंव +चॆं= आपंवचॆं, hence one says  āpãvcẽ  not āpãvacẽ , आपय+ता=आपयता, hence we say āpaytā not āpayatā.

As a result of schwa syncope, the Konkani pronunciation of many words differs from that expected from a literal Sanskrit-style rendering of Devanagari. For instance, करता is kartā not karatā, आपयता is āpaytā not āpayatā, वेद is vēd not vēda and मिरसांग is mirsāṅg not mirasāṅga.

For instance, the letter sequence ळब is pronounced differently in मळब (sky) and मळबार (in the sky). In मळब, there is no schwa deletion for the letter ळ, since it is the second letter in a three letter word that ends with अ. Hence it is pronounced as maḷab. In मळबार, the letter ळ has schwa deletion since it is the second letter of a word with four letters. Hence it is pronounced as maḷbār. While native speakers correctly pronounce the sequences differently in different contexts, non-native speakers and voice-synthesis software can make them "sound unnatural", making it difficult for the listener to grasp the intended meaning.

Proposed scripts
There have been various proposals to have a script specifically for Konkani. In 1965, S. V. Raykar from Sirsi in Karnataka devised a distinctive script for Konkani by combining features of the Devanagari and Kannada scripts. Similarly, in 2020, Ronan Lewis from Udupi created a unique script for Konkani using alphabets from various languages including Arabic, French and Hebrew. There is also a movement to revive the Goykanadi script and a proposal has been made to introduce a Unicode block for Goykanadi. In 1993, Gajanana Ghantkar wrote the book History of Goa through Gõykanadi script, which has many historical Konkani documents written in Goykanadi, along with its Devanagari transliteration.

See also
 Canara Konkani
 Konkani phonology
 Konkani language
 Konkani language agitation

Citations

Further reading
 Romi Konkani: The story of a Goan script, born out of Portuguese influence, which faces possible decline, Karthik Malli (Firstpost)

Script, Konkani
Brahmic scripts